Jane Lang is an American lawyer, arts philanthropist, and arts education promoter. She has been characterized as a neighborhood activist, the primary force responsible for revitalizing a run-down area of Washington, D.C. She is the daughter of entrepreneur and philanthropist Eugene Lang, and the older sister of actor Stephen Lang.

She also co-founded the law firm Sprenger + Lang. In her legal career, Jane Lang has specialized in employment litigation and housing law.  In several ground-breaking cases, Jane Lang has settled class-action lawsuits against employers for sexual harassment, race discrimination, and other similar broad-reaching cases.

At Sprenger + Lang she has represented plaintiffs in employment discrimination cases, including race discrimination class actions that were settled against the Pillsbury Co. and Northwest Airlines, with consent decrees in 1990 and 1991. She was lead counsel with Paul Sprenger in In re Pepco Employment Litigation   and numerous other cases litigated during the first half of the 1990s. She was instrumental in negotiating settlements in several of Sprenger + Lang's cases, including cases against Maytag and Control Data Corp.

Education
 Swarthmore College, 1967. (Phi Beta Kappa)
 University of Pennsylvania Law School, J.D., 1970. (Member of the Law Review)

Legal career
From 1970 until 1979, she practiced law with the Washington D.C. law firm of Steptoe & Johnson, becoming its first female partner in 1977. From 1979 to 1981, she served as General Counsel for the United States Department of Housing and Urban Development. After that, she returned to her former law firm Steptoe & Johnson until 1986.

After leaving Steptoe & Johnson, she founded her own firm, developing a plaintiffs' practice. In 1989, she and Paul Sprenger joined their firms, becoming Sprenger + Lang. Though now she is "Of Counsel" to the firm, she remains involved with Sprenger + Lang's class action lawsuit for age discrimination in the TV Writers' Case.

Philanthropy
Jane Lang served as the first Chairman of the Board of Directors and President of the Atlas Performing Arts Center, in Washington, D.C. Lang is currently listed as Founder, Chair Emeritus. The locally revered but ruined Atlas Theatre in a run-down neighborhood in northeast Washington was renovated and now functions as a multiple-use performing arts center.   The non-profit arts center has become the namesake institution the area, leading the revitalization of the so-called "Atlas District" in Washington.

Jane Lang is a trustee of The Sprenger Lang Foundation, a private family charitable organization based in Washington, D.C.  The foundation's primary purpose is to support the arts and arts education. Grants and contributions are made primarily to producing theaters, musical groups, dance troupes, educational institutions, health care facilities, and other cultural institutions.  The Sprenger Lang Foundation solicits new scripts as part of an annual Nathan Miller History Play Contest. The producing division of the foundation is Tribute Productions, presenting plays and musicals.

Honors
Paul Sprenger and Jane Lang were included in Washingtonian magazine's 2007 list of Washingtonians of the year.

Notes

References

External links
 
 

American philanthropists
American people of Hungarian-Jewish descent
American people of Russian-Jewish descent
Jewish American philanthropists
Swarthmore College alumni
Place of birth missing (living people)
Year of birth missing (living people)
University of Pennsylvania Law School alumni
Living people
American women lawyers
Lawyers from Washington, D.C.
21st-century American Jews
21st-century American women